Cellana taitensis is a species of limpet, a marine gastropod mollusc in the family Nacellidae.

Description
The shell size varies between 23 mm and 30 mm.

Distribution
This species is distributed along French Polynesia and Pitcairn

References

 Nakano & Ozawa (2007). Worldwide phylogeography of limpets of the order Patellogastropoda: Molecular, morphological and palaeontological evidence. Journal of Molluscan Studies 73(1) 79-99

External links
 

Nacellidae
Gastropods described in 1798